The Italian community of Australia has played an influential role in the history of Australian soccer, particularly evident in the state of Victoria. Numerous stand-alone, merged and de-merged clubs have been formed since 1930, primarily in the Greater Melbourne area. Clubs can also be presently found in the Geelong, Latrobe Valley & Goulburn Valley areas. As of the 2020 season, the Italian community is represented in all eight competitive state leagues, with a handful of clubs competing in competitive rural and metropolitan amateur leagues. Multiple Australian national team players featured for Italian backed clubs in their youth before making their international debuts.

History
The first known Italian football/sporting club founded in Victoria was Savoia, which was founded in the early 1930s. The club dissolved as a result of World War II, however remnants of the club lead to the founding of the second-ever and currently oldest presently operating clubs being Brunswick Zebras (and Moreland Zebras). Numerous clubs are believed to have taken various types of inspirations from professional clubs in Italy.

It is debated regarding which club is the most successful and has the largest following after multiple mergers and de-mergers. Brunswick Zebras was one of three Italian-backed clubs to participate in Australia's former national tier one league, the National Soccer League, with the others being Carlton and Gippsland Falcons. Then playing under the name Brunswick Juventus, the club were national champions of the 1985 season, and were Southern conference premiers of the 1986 season. Carlton would finish second in their inaugural in both the regular season and the final series, and won its first silverware in the 1999–00 season in finishing first in the National Youth League. Today, a total of twenty four clubs are known to have a considerable connection to the Italian community.

Active clubs

As of the 2022 Football Season

Former clubs
As of June 2022

See also
Italian Australian
Italian community of Melbourne
List of Italian soccer clubs in Australia
List of sports clubs inspired by others
List of Croatian soccer clubs in Australia
List of Greek Soccer clubs in Australia
List of Serbian soccer clubs in Australia

References

 
Italian-Australian culture
Italy
Australia

Italian
Italian Soccer clubs
Italian-Australian backed sports clubs of Victoria